The 1939 National League Division Two was the second season of British speedway's National League Division Two. The season was never completed, due to the outbreak of World War II.

Summary
As with the previous season, there were several team changes. Southampton Saints had moved up to the National League and Bristol Bulldogs had moved down to take their place. Other new entrants were Crystal Palace Glaziers, Stoke and Middlesbrough. Absentees from the end of the previous season were Lea Bridge, West Ham Hawks (West Ham's reserve team), Birmingham (Hall Green) and Leeds Lions.

Newcastle were leading the league at the point of abandonment. Middlesbrough resigned after 8 matches, Crystal Palace Glaziers after 10 matches and Stoke after 14 matches. Belle Vue Aces provided a team to complete Stoke's fixtures.

Uncompleted table Division Two
The season was incomplete due to the outbreak of World War II. Uncompleted table on September 1.

+ Belle Vue Reserves replaced Stoke Potters mid-season. Stoke scored 4 points from 8 matches, Belle Vue reserves scored 4 points from 6 matches.

Middlesbrough and Crystal Palace Glaziers withdrew mid-season and their records were expunged.

Leading averages (league only)

National Trophy
The 1939 National Trophy was the ninth edition of the Knockout Cup. Wembley and Belle Vue were declared joint winners following the abandonment of the final fixture due to the outbreak of the war. 
Sheffield Tigers won the Division 2 Final round and therefore qualified for the quarter finals proper (the round when the tier one sides entered the competition).

Qualifying quarterfinals

Qualifying semifinals

Final

First leg

Second leg

Sheffield were declared National League (Div 2) Champions, winning on aggregate 114–100.

See also
List of United Kingdom Speedway League Champions
Knockout Cup (speedway)

References

Speedway National League Division Two
1939 in British motorsport
1939 in speedway